Troides miranda, the Miranda birdwing, is a birdwing butterfly that inhabits Borneo and Sumatra.

Related species
Troides miranda is a member of the Troides amphrysus species group. The members of this clade are:

Troides amphrysus (Cramer, [1779])
Troides andromache (Staudinger, 1892)
Troides cuneifera (Oberthür, 1879)
Troides miranda (Butler, 1869)

References

Kurt Rumbucher,Béla von Knötgen and Oliver Schäffler, Knötgen 1999 Part 7, Papilionidae IV. Troides II., amphrysus-group in Erich Bauer and Thomas Frankenbach Eds. Butterflies of the World. Keltern: Goecke & Evers .

External links

Troides miranda at Ngypal

miranda
Butterflies described in 1869
Butterflies of Borneo
Butterflies of Indonesia
Taxa named by Arthur Gardiner Butler